Samuel Kwicompae Wowoah (born 17 June 1976) is a Swedish former professional footballer who played as a left back or left winger.

Club career
After playing youth football for IFK Lindesberg, Wowoah joined Örebro SK, he then played two years in lower divisions before joining Djurgårdens IF with which he won two Swedish Championships.  He also played for Halmstads BK two seasons before moving to IFK Göteborg in 2005. He then left the club after the 2006 season.  In January 2008 he rejoined Örebro SK.

International career
He played 11 games for the Sweden U19 team between 1993 and 1994. In March 2008, Wowoah was called up to Liberian national team, but never made an appearance for the team.

Honours 
Djurgårdens IF

 Allsvenskan: 2002, 2003

References

External links
 Örebro SK profile
 

1976 births
Living people
Association football midfielders
Association football forwards
Swedish footballers
People from Lindesberg Municipality
Swedish people of Liberian descent
Sportspeople of Liberian descent
Sweden youth international footballers
Allsvenskan players
Örebro SK players
Djurgårdens IF Fotboll players
Halmstads BK players
IFK Göteborg players
Division 2 (Swedish football) players

Ettan Fotboll players
Motala AIF players
Eliteserien players
Stabæk Fotball players
Cypriot First Division players
Enosis Neon Paralimni FC players
Swedish expatriate footballers
Swedish expatriate sportspeople in Norway
Expatriate footballers in Norway
Swedish expatriate sportspeople in Cyprus
Expatriate footballers in Cyprus
Sportspeople from Örebro County